Phytoecia orbicollis is a species of beetle in the family Cerambycidae. It was described by Reiche and Saulcy in 1858. It is known from Syria, Cyprus, Armenia, Lebanon, and Turkey.

Subspecies
 Phytoecia orbicollis orbicollis Reiche & Saulcy, 1858
 Phytoecia orbicollis adelpha Ganglbauer, 1886

References

Phytoecia
Beetles described in 1858